Watervliet High School is a public secondary school in Watervliet, Michigan, United States. It serves students in grades 9-12 for the Watervliet Public Schools.

Academics
In the 2019 U.S. News & World Report annual ranking of high schools, Watervliet was ranked 5,771st nationally and 207th in Michigan.

Demographics
The demographic breakdown of the 382 students enrolled for 2017-18 was:
Male - 50.0%
Female - 50.0%
Native American/Alaskan - 1.3%
Asian - 0.5%
Black - 3.4%
Hispanic - 9.9%
White - 81.7%
Multiracial - 3.2%
54.2% of the students were eligible for free or reduced-cost lunch.

Athletics

The Watervliet Panthers competes in the Southwestern Athletic Conference. School colors are maroon and white. The following Michigan High School Athletic Association (MHSAA) sanctioned sports are offered:

Baseball (boys)
Basketball (girls and boys) 
Cross country (girls and boys)
Boys state runner up - 1973
Football (boys) 
State runner up - 1979
Golf (boys) 
Soccer (girls and boys) 
Softball (girls) 
Track and field (girls and boys)
Volleyball (girls) 
Wrestling (boys)

References

External links

School district website

Public high schools in Michigan
Schools in Berrien County, Michigan